Terrifyer is the third studio album by American grindcore band Pig Destroyer. It was released in 2004 by Relapse Records.

The album includes a second disc recorded in DVD-Audio and mixed with 5.1 surround sound. The disc contains one sludge metal song called "Natasha". The Japanese release of Terrifyer includes four bonus tracks, and includes "Natasha" as a second CD instead of a DVD. "Natasha" was reissued on a regular CD as a separate release in 2008. The album booklet features a six-page story of how Natasha became the "Terrifyer". Some copies of Terrifyer were released with a slip of paper on the cover to hide the artwork.

In 2017, Rolling Stone ranked Terrifyer as 88th on their list of "The 100 Greatest Metal Albums of All Time". "Gravedancer" appeared on the Tony Hawk's American Wasteland soundtrack as a cut down 1:47 version (ending where the sample begins).

Track listing

Accolades

Personnel
Brian Harvey – drums
J. R. Hayes – vocals, design
Scott Hull – guitars, bass ("Natasha"), engineering, production, mastering
Matthew Mills – solo ("Towering Flesh")
Richard "Grindfather" Johnson – vocals ("Crawl of Time")
Katherine Katz – vocals ("Lost Cause")
Chris Taylor – art
Jonathan Canady – design
Matthew F. Jacobson – executive production

References

2004 albums
Pig Destroyer albums